Antonio Pocovi (January 20, 1922 - November 18, 2004) was an Argentine athlete who competed in the 1948 Summer Olympics in the 400m and the 4 × 400 m relay, in both events he finished 3rd in the first round and failed to advance.
He has also trained athletes and served as a coach of the national team.

References
Sports Reference Profile

1922 births
2004 deaths
Argentine male sprinters
Olympic athletes of Argentina
Athletes (track and field) at the 1948 Summer Olympics
20th-century Argentine people